The Flesh Is Weak is a 1957 British film directed by Don Chaffey. It stars John Derek and Milly Vitale. Distributors Corporation of America released the film in the USA as a double feature with Blonde in Bondage.

Plot
Tony Giani is a Soho pimp who preys on young provincial women who come to London seeking work. Marissa Cooper, one such girl, has just arrived in London. Giani spots her and offers her a job in the Golden Bucket, a nightclub. In her innocence, she doesn't realize the club is a front for prostitution. When she tries to escape from the pimp's control, she is set up by Giani and his brother Angelo and arrested by the police. Investigative journalist Lloyd Buxton persuades her to give evidence against the brothers leading to their imprisonment and her freedom.

Cast
 John Derek as Tony Giani
 Milly Vitale as Marissa Cooper
 William Franklyn as Lloyd Buxton
 Martin Benson as Angelo Giani
 Freda Jackson as Trixie
 Norman Wooland as Inspector Kingcombe 
 Harold Lang as Henry 
 Patricia Jessel as Millie 
 John Paul as Sergeant Franks
 Denis Shaw as Saradine 
 Joe Robinson as Lofty 
 Roger Snowden as Benny 
 Patricia Plunkett as Doris Newman
 Shirley Anne Field as Susan

Source: BFI

Production
The film was based on the Messina vice gang who operated in the West End of London. Its original title was Women of Night then Not for Love before being changed to The Flesh is Weak.

Reception
The film was a box office success - according to Variety it was the fourth highest grossing film in England. The movie is not listed in Kinematograph Weekly as one of the most popular British films of 1957 but that magazine did say the movie was "enjoying a triumphant West End run".

The reception to the film enabled the producer and director to raise finance for another movie, A Question of Adultery.

References

External links

1957 films
Films directed by Don Chaffey
Films about prostitution in the United Kingdom
British crime drama films
1957 crime drama films
Films set in London
1950s English-language films
1950s British films